Kreidler was a German manufacturer of bicycles, mopeds and motorcycles. 

Kreidler was originally based in Kornwestheim, between Ludwigsburg and Stuttgart.  It was founded in 1903 as "Kreidlers Metall- und Drahtwerke" (Kreidlers metal and wire factory) by Anton Kreidler and started to build motorcycles in 1951. In 1959 one third of all German motorcycles were Kreidler. In the 1970s Kreidler had very great success in motorsport. Especially in the Netherlands the riders Jan de Vries and Henk van Kessel were successful.

Kreidler went out of business in 1982 and the rights to the trade mark were sold to the businessman Rudolf Scheidt who had Italian manufacturer Garelli Motorcycles make mopeds under the Kreidler name until 1988. The rights to the Kreidler brand were subsequently acquired by bicycle manufacturer Prophete. Today the brand is used by Prophete's subsidiary Cycle Union GmbH based in Oldenburg, Germany, where bikes are built and distributed to dealers mainly throughout Europe.

Kreidler was active in Grand Prix motorcycle with great success in the 1970s and 1980s, scoring eight world champion titles in 50 cc class:
1971 Jan de Vries
1973 Jan de Vries
1974 Henk van Kessel
1975 Ángel Nieto
1979 Eugenio Lazzarini
1980 Eugenio Lazzarini
1982 Stefan Dörflinger

Gallery

See also
 Kreidler Florett RS

References

Motorcycle manufacturers of Germany
Vehicle manufacturing companies established in 1903